Melktert (Afrikaans for milk tart) is a South African dessert originally created by the Dutch settlers in the "Cape" (South Africa) consisting of a sweet pastry crust containing a custard filling made from milk, flour, sugar and eggs. The ratio of milk to eggs is higher than in a traditional Portuguese custard tart or Chinese egg tart, resulting in a lighter texture and a stronger milk flavour.

The dessert originated among settlers at the Dutch Cape Colony in the 17th century, and is believed to have developed from the Dutch mattentaart, a cheesecake-like dessert which was included in the cookbook Een Notabel Boexcken Van Cokeryen (A Notable Book of Cookery) published by Thomas van der Noot around 1514. Some recipes require that the custard be baked in the crust, while others call for the custard to be prepared in advance, and then placed in the crust before serving. Cinnamon is often sprinkled over its surface, and the milk used for the custard may also be infused with a cinnamon stick before preparation. A staple at church fetes and home industries, and commonplace in South African supermarkets, melktert may be served chilled or at room temperature, or slightly warmed.

See also

 Cook and Enjoy It – authentic South African recipes
 List of African dishes

References

External links 

South African cuisine
Tarts
Custard desserts
Milk dishes